Lynn Ferguson Tweddle (born 11 April 1965) is a Scottish writer, actress, and story coach. She is the younger sister of comedian Craig Ferguson and is known for voicing the character of Mac in the animated film, Chicken Run.

Early life
Ferguson grew up in Cumbernauld. She was the youngest of four and, like her sister, was Senior Prefect at Cumbernauld High School. She left school at the age of 18 and worked one season as a Bluecoat for Pontin's. She was then accepted at the Royal Scottish Academy of Music and Drama where she gained a BA in Dramatic Studies in 1986.

To work as a professional actress, however, she required an Equity union card which was at that point only available through paid work, so with fellow student she formed the Alexander Sisters – a comedy double act parodying traditional Scottish variety styles typified by the Alexander Brothers. She was then sidetracked into standup comedy doing her first paid gig on STV's Funny Farm. Before long she gained residence as compere at the Red Rose Comedy Club in Finsbury Park, London and continued to perform at numerous gigs throughout the UK.

Though a comic at night, Ferguson was also writing and presenting for BBC Scotland's children's program Megamag. She played a comedy character journalist Fergski who blundered through interviewing teen artists of that era – Ant & Dec, Aswad and Michelle Gayle. In one episode a spritely Phill Jupitus dressed as a security guard stops Fergski interviewing East 17 at the now defunct Top of the Pops set.

In 1995, she was commissioned to write an hour of standup comedy for the Edinburgh Fringe Festival but instead wrote her first play, Heart and Sole. This solo show won her the Stage Award for Acting Excellence and transferred to the Hampstead Theatre before being toured to Hong Kong and Melbourne.

Career

Writer
Ferguson has written extensively for BBC Radio 4: three series (18 episodes) of the popular sitcom Millport, various pieces for Woman's Hour including a series of updated fairy tales called After Happy Ever alongside afternoon plays ("The Lie" "The Fly" "Kindling") and Craig Fergusons standup monologues.

For BBC Radio Scotland she wrote and presented a series exploring the minds of comedy writers, Laughed Off the Page, interviewing Colin Bostock-Smith, Galton and Simpson, Ian Pattison, and Dick Vosburgh.

For TV, she has written half-hour pilots for BBC Two and BBC Scotland and a half-hour short film for Channel 4.

A regular contributor to the Edinburgh Fringe Festival, eight of her plays have been produced there and she has won a Fringe First Award from The Scotsman. In 2016, she returned to Edinburgh, writing the play "Careful" for Horse McDonald, and again in 2017,  co-writing "Life, Death and Duran Duran" with one of her story clients, Sam Shaber.
November 2017, she premiered her new play The Weir Sisters in Glasgow at Òran Mór Play, pie and a pint

As well as her performance pieces, she has written various columns for publications including The Scotsman, The Stage, Time Out, The Big Issue and The Herald.

She wrote for The Late Late Show with Craig Ferguson, her brother's American talk show/variety program, from October 2008 to June 2011. She was also a writing consultant for Pixar on the film Brave.

Actress
As well as winning the Stage Award for Acting Excellence she has been nominated twice. In addition to her own written works, she has performed in theatre extensively.

Ferguson toured with the Royal National Theatre in the lead part, Shen Te/ Shui Ta, of the Bertolt Brecht play The Good Person of Szechwan and played the lead in the Traverse Theatre production of Douglas Maxwell's Melody.

Vocally, she has numerous credits for radio works and played Mac in the film Chicken Run. For TV she performed regular parts for the Channel 4, comedy drama No Angels and Ben Elton's BBC1 sitcom Blessed, as well as appearances in The Catherine Tate Show and The Bill amongst others.

As herself
Ferguson has presented a number of programs including, Doing the Festival for STV and XS, an arts program for the BBC.

In addition, she has been a contestant on the challenging BBC Radio 4 panel game shows Just a Minute, Loose Ends and Banter.

In April and September 2008, she made guest appearances on her brother Craig's talk show, The Late Late Show with Craig Ferguson.

Personal life 
She is married to Mark Tweddle, a civil servant and previously a management consultant. The couple have two sons .

References

External links

Edinburgh Comedy Festival

1965 births
Living people
Alumni of the Royal Conservatoire of Scotland
Audiobook narrators
Scottish writers
Scottish women comedians
Scottish film actresses
Scottish television actresses
Scottish voice actresses
Comedians from Glasgow
Place of birth missing (living people)
People educated at Cumbernauld Academy
People from Cumbernauld